Cherry Township may refer to the following townships in the United States:

 Cherry Township, St. Louis County, Minnesota
 Cherry Township, Butler County, Pennsylvania
 Cherry Township, Sullivan County, Pennsylvania